Bhoolokadalli Yamaraja a 1979 Indian Kannada-language film, directed by Siddalingaiah and produced by N. Veeraswamy, S. P. Varadaraj, Siddalingaiah and J. Chandulal Jain. The film stars Lokesh, M. P. Shankar, Jai Jagadish and Mohan. The film has musical score by C. Ashwath.

Cast

Lokesh
M. P. Shankar
Jai Jagadish
Mohan
Uday Jadugar
Anjali
Vijayalalitha
Vani
Chandrika
Shanthala
T. N. Balakrishna in Guest Appearance
C. H. Loknath in Guest Appearance
N. S. Rao in Guest Appearance

Soundtrack
The music was composed by C. Ashwath.

References

External links
 
 

1970s Kannada-language films
Films directed by Siddalingaiah